Patrick Laffan (8 June 1939 – 14 March 2019) was an Irish actor.	

Laffan is best remembered for playing the lothario milkman Pat Mustard in the Channel Four sitcom Father Ted episode "Speed 3" (1998), and Mr Burgess in Roddy Doyle's The Snapper (1993).

Filmography

References

External links
 

1939 births
2019 deaths
20th-century Irish male actors
21st-century Irish male actors
Actors from County Meath
Father Ted
Irish male film actors
Irish male stage actors
Irish male television actors